Zvonimir "Džimi" Petričević (26 July 1940 – 20 January 2009) was a Croatian basketball player and architect. He represented the Yugoslavia national basketball team internationally. Petričević was a member of the Yugoslavia national team that competed in the men's tournament at the 1960 Summer Olympics

References

External links
 

1940 births
2009 deaths
20th-century Croatian architects
21st-century Croatian architects
Basketball players at the 1960 Summer Olympics
Basketball players at the 1964 Summer Olympics
Centers (basketball)
Croatian men's basketball players
Faculty of Architecture, University of Zagreb alumni
KK Cibona players
Mediterranean Games bronze medalists for Yugoslavia
Olympic basketball players of Yugoslavia
OKK Beograd players
People from Prizren
University of Antwerp alumni
Yugoslav architects
Yugoslav men's basketball players
1963 FIBA World Championship players
Mediterranean Games medalists in basketball
Competitors at the 1963 Mediterranean Games